Dr. Jiri Zidek (active 1970-2000s) is a Czech-born American paleontologist and entomologist.

He was founder of the Journal of Vertebrate Paleontology at the University of Oklahoma in 1980.

Publications
 Kansas Hamilton Quarry (Upper Pennsylvanian) Acanthodes, with remarks on the previously reported North American occurrences of the genus J Zidek - 1976

References

Czech paleontologists
University of Oklahoma faculty
Living people
American paleontologists
Year of birth missing (living people)